Allah Mohammad Ghazanfar (born 15 July 2007) is an Afghan cricketer, who has played for Mis Ainak Knights in the Afghan Shpageeza Cricket League and Rawalpindi Raiders in the Pakistan Junior League.

Personal life
Ghazanfar is from Paktia Province, Afghanistan. He has five older brothers, and as of 2022, he lived in Kabul.

Career
Ghazanfar began as a fast bowler. He is an off-spinner who bowls finger spin, after having been taught spin bowling by former Afghanistan captain Dawlat Ahmadzai. His bowling technique has been compared to Afghan international Mujeeb Zadran. Ghazanfar trains at the Mirza Mohammad Katawazai Cricket Centre in Kabul, and has trained with the Afghanistan national under-19 cricket team.

Ghazanfar has played for the Mis Ainak Knights in the Afghan Shpageeza Cricket League. On his debut, he took 1/27 in 4 overs, and he took four wickets in his second appearance.
In 2022, he played for Rawalpindi Raiders in the Pakistan Junior League; he was one of 12 overseas players in the competition.
He was included in the draft for the 2022–23 Big Bash League season, but was not selected. He has been included in the Far Western United team for the inaugural season of the Nepal T20 League. At the age of 15, Ghazanfar was included in the auction for the 2023 Indian Premier League. He was the youngest player entered into that year's auction, and his base price for the auction was  rupees. He went unsold in the auction.

References

External links
 

2007 births
Living people
Afghan cricketers
People from Paktia Province